Czertyń  is a village in the administrative district of Gmina Ińsko, within Stargard County, West Pomeranian Voivodeship, in north-western Poland. 

The village has a population of 120.

References

Villages in Stargard County